Ernst Jean-Joseph (11 June 1948 – 14 August 2020) was a Haitian football midfielder who played for Haiti in the 1974 FIFA World Cup. He played for Violette A.C. and briefly for Chicago Sting. In the summer of 1976, he played in the National Soccer League with Ottawa Tigers.

Described as a "red-haired mulatto" by Brian Glanville, Jean-Joseph failed a doping test after Haiti's opening match with Italy in 1974. After first contending that he had  received a “lot of pills” from his physician in Haiti for treatment of asthma (and being contradicted by the team doctor, who told the media he had no such ailment), he admitted that he had used a stimulant containing phenmetrazine to improve his performance. Jean-Joseph was the first player to be suspended for using a banned substance in the history of the World Cup.

The vice-president of the Haitian FA, Major Acedius St. Louis, was also the commander of the Leopards, a notorious elite battalion of the Haitian army under Jean-Claude Duvalier’s personal command.
Haitian officials dragged Jean-Joseph out of the Grünwald Sports School in Munich where the team had been staying, beat him, and held him over night at the Sheraton Hotel and flew him back to Haiti. The terrified Jean-Joseph had made several phone calls to a sympathetic hostess who passed on the information to the designated team attaché, Kurt Renner. The World Cup organizing committee, furious at Renner for telling the story to the media, removed him from his post.

Jean-Joseph's World Cup experience was not the end of his international career. Jean-Joseph played in seven 1978 World Cup qualifiers and one 1982 World Cup qualifier, a 1–0 win over Netherlands Antilles on 12 September 1980 in Port-au-Prince.

Jean-Joseph later became manager of Violette A.C.

References

External links
FIFA profile

1948 births
2020 deaths
People from Cap-Haïtien
Haitian footballers
Haitian expatriate footballers
Haiti international footballers
Association football midfielders
Ligue Haïtienne players
Violette AC players
North American Soccer League (1968–1984) players
Chicago Sting (NASL) players
Expatriate soccer players in the United States
Haitian expatriate sportspeople in the United States
1974 FIFA World Cup players
CONCACAF Championship-winning players
Doping cases in association football
Haitian sportspeople in doping cases
Haitian people of Mulatto descent
Haitian football managers
Canadian National Soccer League players
Haitian expatriate sportspeople in Canada
Expatriate soccer players in Canada